The 1949 Tulsa Golden Hurricane football team represented the University of Tulsa during the 1949 college football season. In their fourth year under head coach Buddy Brothers, the Golden Hurricane compiled a 5–5–1 record, 1–2–1 against conference opponents, and finished in fifth place in the Missouri Valley Conference.

Schedule

References

Tulsa
Tulsa Golden Hurricane football seasons
Tulsa Golden Hurricane football